Margo Greenwood may refer to:
 Margo Lainne Greenwood (fl. 2021), Canadian Indigenous scholar
 Margery Greenwood, Viscountess Greenwood (1886-1968), known as Margo